Akaytala is a rural locality (a selo) in Buynaksky District, Republic of Dagestan, Russia. The population was 688 as of 2010. There are 8 streets.

Geography 
Akaytala is located 37 km northwest of Buynaksk (the district's administrative centre) by road. Dubki is the nearest rural locality.

References 

Rural localities in Buynaksky District